RopeWalks is a name given to a vicinity of Liverpool city centre that runs from Lydia Ann Street to Renshaw Street widthways, and from Roscoe Street to Hanover Street lengthwise.

The name is derived from the craft of rope-making for sailing ships that dominated the area until the 19th century. It is characterised by its long, straight streets running parallel to each other. The streets were built in this way to allow rope manufacturers to lay the ropes out lengthways during production. There are a number of historic warehouse buildings and it owes much of its character to the rope-making industry.

The area includes the Foundation for Art and Creative Technology, Europe's oldest established Chinatown, the grand façade of St. Luke's bombed-out Church, and a number of cafés, bars and clubs.

Ropes were made in fields but ropemakers bought or rented thin long strips of land. It was the sale of these thin strips, one by one at different times, that led to long thin streets with few interconnections. The streets themselves were not used in manufacture, the roperies pre-dated the streets.

See also
Ropewalk

References

External links 

 RopeWalks Liverpool website
 liverpool.gov.uk
 Ropewalks

Entertainment districts in the United Kingdom
Liverpool